James Mudge (1844–1918) was an American Methodist Episcopal clergyman and writer, nephew of Zachariah Mudge.  He was born at West Springfield, Mass., and graduated from Wesleyan University in 1865 and from Boston University School of Theology in 1868.  The same year he entered the ministry, joining the New England conference.  While a missionary in India from 1873 to 1883 he edited the Lucknow Witness.  After his return he was pastor of churches in Massachusetts until 1908, serving also as lecturer on missions at the Boston University School of Theology.  In 1889 he became secretary of the New England conference.  For many years he was book editor of Zion's Herald.  He wrote:
 Memorial of Rev. Z. A. Mudge:  Historical Sketch of the Missions Of the Methodist Episcopal Church (1877)
 Growth in Holiness (1895)
 A Defense of Christian Perfection (1896)
 The Best of Browning (1898)
 The Life Ecstatic (1906)
 Fénelon the Mystic (1906)
 The Riches of His Grace (1909)
 History of the New England Conference (1910)
 The Perfect Life in Experience and Doctrine (1911)
 Hymns of Trust (1912)
 Religious Experience Exemplified in the Lives of Illustrious Christians (1913)

External links
Biography from 1905
 
 

1844 births
1918 deaths
19th-century Methodist ministers
20th-century Methodist ministers
American Methodist missionaries
American Christian clergy
People from West Springfield, Massachusetts
Methodist missionaries in India
Wesleyan University alumni
Boston University School of Theology alumni
American religious writers
American expatriates in India